The 120mm М95 Long Range Mortar is a  mortar that was developed by Serbian Military Technical Institute. It is long-range and heavier mortar compared to the light mortar 120mm M75 and represents further development of Universal Mortar UB M52.

Design overview
The М95 LONG RANGE Mortar fires fin-stabilized ammunition from a smoothbore barrel. It has muzzle attached to barrel to reduce pressure. М95's require trucks or other vehicle to move them, but compared to field artillery it is much lighter. M95 LONG RANGE mortar outrange all light and medium mortars and even some howitzers and mountain guns, his explosive power is much greater than 60mm and 81/82mm mortars. It can be deployed on battlefield in less than a minute. It uses NSB-5A sight for directing fire.

Deployment
Mortar 120mm М95 LONG RANGE is in service with the Serbian Armed Forces since 1995. It has a mission to provide indirect fire support to units.

The M95 is transported with TAM-150, FAP 1118, Zastava NTV or other vehicles capable to attach 465kgs trailer.

Specifications

The M95 is capable of firing the following munitions:

High explosive shells 
 HE mortar shell M62P8
 HE mortar shell Mk12P1
 HE mortar shell Mk12P1-L
Illumination shells 
Illumination mortar shell M87P1
Illumination mortar shell M01
Smoke shells 
Smoke mortar shell M64P2
Smoke mortar shell M64P3
Smoke mortar shell Mk12
Smoke mortar shell M89
Practice shells
Practice mortar shell M63P2
and other shells in 120mm in accordance with barrel pressure.

Operators

See also 
 Soltam M-65 120 mm mortar
 M327 
 E56 120 mm Mortar

References

Military Technical Institute Belgrade
Artillery of Serbia
120mm mortars
Military equipment introduced in the 1990s